Jeremy Griffith (born 1945) is an Australian biologist and author. He first came to public attention for his attempts to find the Tasmanian tiger. He later became noted for his writings on the human condition and theories about human progress, which seek to give a biological, rational explanation of human behaviour. He founded the World Transformation Movement in 1983.

Early life
Griffith was raised on a sheep property in central NSW. He was educated at Tudor House School in New South Wales and received a first-class honours degree in biology in 1965 at the Geelong Grammar School in Victoria. He subsequently began a science degree at the University of New England in northern New South Wales. Finally, Griffith completed his BSc degree in zoology at the University of Sydney in 1971.

He first became known for his search for surviving Tasmanian tigers or thylacines, the last known specimen of which died in captivity in 1936. The search conducted from 1967 to 1973, included exhaustive surveys along Tasmania's west coast; installation of automatic camera stations; prompt investigations of claimed sightings; and, in 1972, the creation of the Thylacine Expeditionary Research Team with Bob Brown, which concluded without finding any evidence of the animal's continuing existence.

Writings on the human condition
Griffith began writing on the human condition in 1975, publishing the first of his six books on the subject in 1988. A Species In Denial (2003) became a bestseller in Australia and New Zealand. His books seek to give a biological, rational explanation of human behaviour and include references to philosopical and religious sources.

His biological works on the origins of human nature assert that “humans act angrily because of a battle between instinct and intellect.” An article by Griffith published in The Irish Times summarised the thesis presented in Freedom: The End of The Human Condition (2016) as “Adam & Eve without the guilt: explaining our battle between instinct and intellect”; and Kirkus Reviews wrote that “Griffith offers a treatise about the true nature of humanity and about overcoming anxieties about the world.”

The Templeton Prize winner and biologist Charles Birch, the New Zealand zoologist John Morton, the former president of the Canadian Psychiatric Association Harry Prosen, and Australian Everest mountaineer Tim Macartney-Snape have been long-standing proponents of Griffith’s ideas. Birch wrote the Foreword to Griffith’s 2004 book A Species In Denial. Morton publicly defended Griffith when he and his ideas were attacked in the mid-1990s. In 2021 Prosen wrote “Griffith puts forward a wide-ranging induction-derived synthesis. As Professor Scott Churchill, former Chair of Psychology at the University of Dallas, said in his review of Freedom, “Griffith’s perspective comes to us not as a simple opinion of one man, but  rather as an inductive conclusion drawn from sifting through volumes of data  representing what scientists have discovered.” …I have no doubt Griffith’s explanation of the human condition is the holy grail of insight we have sought for the psychological rehabilitation of the human race.”

Griffith analyzes the scientific literature in human evolution, rejecting claims that human ancestors were brutal and aggressive, and instead pointing to fossil evidence such as that of Ardipithecus ramidus in support of his thesis that ancient humans were a gentle, loving and co-operative species. His ideas have been criticised based on perceived problems with the empirical veracity of his anthropological writings, an objection that highlights his reliance on the writings of the South African novelist Sir Laurens Van Der Post, and also the work of anthropologist Elizabeth Marshall Thomas.

In a 2020 article by Griffith, The fury of the left, explained, published in The Spectator Australia, he argues that the ideology of the Left is regressive and might lead to extinction: “…the Left has given in to the temptation of relief-hunting and abandoned that all-important search [for understanding of the human condition].” When interviewed by Alan Jones and Graham Richardson on their Richo & Jones Sky News Australia television program, Griffith said “my article in The Spectator last week was all about how we can bring rationale, understanding to the danger of the Left, reason versus dogma.”

World Transformation Movement
The World Transformation Movement was founded by Griffith in 1983 as the Centre for Humanity’s Adulthood, an organisation dedicated to developing and promoting understanding of the human condition. It was incorporated in 1990 with Griffith and his colleague mountaineer Tim Macartney-Snape among its founding directors and became a registered charity in New South Wales in 1990, known as the Foundation for Humanity’s Adulthood. In 2009, the name changed to World Transformation Movement.

In 1995, Griffith, Macartney-Snape and the Foundation for Humanity’s Adulthood (the World Transformation Movement name at the time) were the subject of an Australian Broadcasting Corporation (ABC) Four Corners program and a Sydney Morning Herald newspaper article, in which it was alleged that Macartney-Snape used speaking appearances at schools to promote the foundation, which was described as a cult, and that Griffith "publishes work of such a poor standard that it has no support at all from the scientific community". 

In 1998, the Australian Broadcasting Authority censured the ABC for unbalanced and inaccurate reporting and breaching the ABC code of practice, with The Bulletin describing the Four Corners program as a “hatchet job”. Griffith objected to being described as a “prophet of the posh” and portrayed as a form of deity as he was during the media controversy, although he was comfortable being referred to as a prophet in a secular sense, and he regards many contemporary thinkers as prophets, including James Darling, Charles Darwin, Sigmund Freud, Carl Jung, Thomas Huxley, Stephen Hawking and Laurens van der Post.

Both the ABC and Herald publications became the subject of defamation actions in the NSW Supreme Court. In 2007, the ABC was ordered to pay Macartney-Snape almost $500,000 in damages, and with costs the payout was expected to exceed $1 million. While the jury found that what the ABC said about Griffith was defamatory (i.e, it would tend to disgrace Griffith or lower public opinion of him), the judge dismissed the case after considering the defences of truth, qualified privilege and comment. Griffith appealed that decision and while the NSW Court of Appeal dismissed the appeal on the basis of qualified privilege and comment being upheld, it found that the defamatory allegation the ABC made about Griffith was not justified. The proceedings against the Herald were resolved when it published an apology to the foundation in 2009.

Other writings
In 2020, an article by Griffith published in The Spectator Australia under the heading ‘The science of bushfires’, about his biological analysis of the dangers of eucalypts in light of the 2019–20 Australian bushfire season, resulted in him appearing on Alan Jones' 2GB radio program, and on the Richo & Jones Sky News Australia television program. Griffith’s analysis also generated interest in the UK.

Selected bibliography

References

Living people
1945 births
Australian biologists
People educated at Geelong Grammar School